Kfar Danis  (كفر دنيس)  is a village in Lebanon, situated in Rashaya District, Beqaa Governorate. It is located north of Dahr El Ahmar.

Population 
The religious majorities in the village are Sunnis and Shiites followed by Druze, Maronites and Greek Orthodox Christians.

A significant percentage of the village population have migrated to the capital city of Beirut. Also, a significant percentage of the village population have migrated overseas to countries such as Brazil, Argentina, United States of America, Canada, Australia, Mexico, Gulf Arab states and European Union (UK and France). Migration figures are high to even suggest that every family in the village would at least have or know of one friend or relative that have migrated to another country.

Notable people 
 Canadian hockey player Nazem Kadri is of local descent through his father, Sam Kadri.
Families:
El Kadri
Al Subahhi
Ismail
Tarras
Assaf
Abou Fares
Abou Shami
Abdlhadi
Hammoud
Ibrahim
Iskandar
Osman

See also
List of cities and towns in Lebanon
List of municipalities of Lebanon

References

Populated places in Rashaya District
Sunni Muslim communities in Lebanon
Shia Muslim communities in Lebanon
Maronite Christian communities in Lebanon
Eastern Orthodox Christian communities in Lebanon
Druze communities in Lebanon